"Cut Your Hair" is a song by American rock band Pavement from their second album, Crooked Rain, Crooked Rain. It was written by Pavement songwriter and lead singer Stephen Malkmus. The song snidely attacks the importance of image in the music industry. In one verse, Malkmus sarcastically recites a fictitious ad looking for a musician to join a band: "advertising looks and chops a must/ no big hair".

The song was released as a single and became the band's best-selling and most popular song. "Cut Your Hair" obtained strong airplay on U.S. indie and alternative radio stations, reaching the top ten on Billboard's Alternative Songs chart in the spring of 1994, spending 12 weeks on the Alternative Billboard chart.

Both B-sides are included on the reissue Crooked Rain, Crooked Rain: LA's Desert Origins.  The unlisted B-side track on the 12" version of the single is an instrumental recording of "Rain Ammunition," and has never been reissued.

In May 2007, NME magazine placed "Cut Your Hair" at number 28 in its list of the 50 Greatest Indie Anthems Ever.

Track listing
 "Cut Your Hair"
 "Camera" (R.E.M. cover)
 "Stare"
 "Rain Ammunition (instrumental)" (hidden track on 12")

The video

The video, released in 1994, is relatively simple, showing the band sitting on a bench at a barber shop, waiting to get their hair cut. Some strange things happen to each band member when they go and sit on the barber's chair:

Mark Ibold - He shakes his head to mess up his hair and then sneezes. The viewer finds out that he sneezed out a cat. He then gives it to the barber and goes back to the bench.
Scott Kannberg - He comes up to the barber's chair dressed in a clothed gorilla suit and gets his hair cut. He is then seen back in human form, and he goes back to the bench.
Bob Nastanovich - When he gets up, he trips over the table of magazines in front of the bench. He tries to drink something out of a flask, and then attempts to drink the barber's Barbicide cleaning solution but the barber will not let him.
Stephen Malkmus - The barber gives him a platter, a king's scepter, a martini, and a paper crown. The audience sees a closeup of him with a tear rolling down his cheek.
Steve West - He asks the barber to cut his hair. Just as he is about to do so, West is suddenly wearing a lizard costume. The barber shakes his head, refusing to give him a haircut.

Each band member has different clothes on when they go back to the bench. After their haircuts, all the band members leave the barbershop very quickly, with Ibold taking a magazine he had been reading.

In an alternate version of the video, a black-and-white TV in the barber shop played a loop of the band acting silly in Malkmus' apartment.

In popular culture
The theme song (as well as the commercial outro music) of the ESPN talk show Pardon the Interruption thematically references the song (regular co-hosts Tony Kornheiser and Michael Wilbon are both bald).
The video was shown on an episode of the animated series Beavis and Butt-Head, in which Butt-Head said of the video, "This is supposed to be funny."
Was featured as downloadable content for Guitar Hero 5.

Soundtrack appearances
"Cut Your Hair" was featured on the soundtrack to Jackass: Number Two, A Very Brady Sequel, The Ultimate Playlist of Noise, The To Do List, and You, Me and Dupree. It is available as a downloadable track for Guitar Hero 5.

Chart performance

References

External links
'Cut Your Hair' song of the day on thishereboogie.com 17 September 2008

1994 singles
Pavement (band) songs
Matador Records singles
1994 songs
Songs written by Stephen Malkmus